The 2019 Big 12 Conference women's soccer tournament was the postseason women's soccer tournament for the Big 12 Conference held from November 3 to 10, 2019. The 7-match tournament was held at the Swope Soccer Village in Kansas City, MO with a combined attendance of 2,025. The 8-team single-elimination tournament consisted of three rounds based on seeding from regular season conference play. The Kansas Jayhawks defeated the TCU Horned Frogs in the championship match to win their 1st conference tournament.

Regular season standings
Source:

Bracket

Awards

Most valuable player
Source:
Defensive MVP – Sarah Peters – Kansas
Offensive MVP – Messiah Bright – TCU

All-Tournament team

References 

 Game 1
 Game 2
 Game 3
 Game 4
 Game 5
 Game 6
 Game 7

 
Big 12 Conference Women's Soccer Tournament